Alvin Earl Walton (born March 14, 1964) is a former American football safety in the National Football League (NFL) for the Washington Redskins and the Baltimore Stallions of the Canadian Football League (CFL).  He played college football at Mt. San Jacinto College and the University of Kansas.  Walton is among a select group who have won both an NFL and CFL championship.

Early life
Walton was born in Riverside, California, and attended Banning High School in Banning, California.

College career
After graduating from high school, Walton attended and played college football at Mt. San Jacinto College for two years, before transferring to the University of Kansas.  He was ruled academically ineligible to compete during what would have been his senior year in 1985, and he never earned a degree.

Professional career

NFL
Walton was drafted in the third round (75th overall) of the 1986 NFL Draft by the Washington Redskins and won Super Bowl XXII and XXVI with the team.  After being release by the team in 1992, he worked for Federal Express and the U.S. Postal Service and attended barber school.

CFL
After being out of football for three years, Walton joined the Baltimore Stallions of the CFL, where he won the 83rd Grey Cup in 1995.  It was the only time an American franchise won the Grey Cup.

Personal life
Walton is married and has seven children.  His wife pawned his two Super Bowl rings and hoped to redeem them when the family's situation improved, but they were sold without Walton's knowledge.

References

External links
 

1964 births
Living people
American football safeties
Baltimore Stallions players
Kansas Jayhawks football players
Sportspeople from Riverside, California
Washington Redskins players
African-American players of Canadian football
Mt. San Jacinto Eagles football players
21st-century African-American people
20th-century African-American sportspeople
Players of American football from Riverside, California
Players of Canadian football from California